JASCO can refer to:

JASCO Applied Sciences
Joint Assault Signals Company